The Western Jets is an Australian rules football club which plays in the Victorian premier U19 competition, the NAB League, since its inception in 1992. The club have developmental squads in the U16, however much of the attention is towards its U18 team.

The club is geographically set in Melbourne's West as part of a decision by AFL Victoria (formerly Football Victoria) to have clubs in all regions of the state.

The club trains in Melbourne's inner west at Crofts Reserve in Altona North and plays NAB League matches at Burbank Oval in Williamstown.  Their current coach is Robbie Chancellor, who replaced Ryan O’Keefe at the end of the 2020 season.

Sponsors 

The club is sponsored by TAC, Victoria University, Australia, Meat2U, Werribee Mazda, Master Dry Cleaners, Divella, Burbank Homes and KFC.

Statistics 

Runners Up (2): 1992, 1993

Wooden Spoons (3): 1997, 1998, 2002

Games Record Holder: Michael Turner (50 games)

Goals Record Holder: Stephen Neilsen (59 goals)

TAC CUP Coach Award Winners: Paul Carson (2000), Bradley Miller (2001)

Draftees 
1992: Dustin Fletcher, Mark Ballan, Brad Copeland, Craig Ellis, Brendan Duncan
1993: Brad Johnson, Robert Stevenson, Darryl Griffin, Aaron James, David Innella, Cain Liddle
1994: Matthew Lloyd, Shannon Grant, Robert Di Rosa, Shawn Lewfatt, Allen Nash, Matthew Belleville, Stephen Zavalas, Lee Fraser, Dean Helmers, Todd McHardy, David Nicholson
1995: -
1996: -
1997: Lance Picioane, Chris Obst, David Antonowicz, Anthony Aloi, 
1998: Heath Scotland, Matthew Pearce
1999: Daniel Giansiracusa, Ty Zantuck, Ben Haynes, James Podsiadly
2000: Paul Chambers
2001: Brad D. Miller
2002: Callum Urch, Dale Carson
2003: Michael Rischitelli, Murray Boyd
2004: Brent Prismall, Ben Davies
2005: Jake Edwards
2006: Bachar Houli
2007: Callan Ward, Will Sullivan
2008: Jayden Post, Mitch Banner, Bryce Carroll
2009: Jack Fitzpatrick, Majak Daw
2011: Will Hoskin-Elliott, Elliott Kavanagh
2012: Spencer White, Lachie Hunter
2013: James Sicily
2014: Liam Duggan, Corey Ellis, Jayden Laverde, Dillon Viojo-Rainbow, Connor Menadue, Brenton Payne
2015: Luke Goetz
2016: Daniel Venables, Oscar Junker
2017: Cameron Rayner, Lachie Fogarty, Tristan Xerri
2018: Zak Butters, Xavier O'Halloran
2019: Josh Honey, Emerson Jeka
2020: Eddie Ford

Source: 1992-2007:

Team of the Year 
1992: Brad Copeland, Dustin Fletcher, Matthew Moylan
1993: Brad Johnson, David Weston, Mark Cheel
1994: Shannon Grant, Matthew Lloyd, Robert Di Rosa
1996: Dion Miles
1997: Lance Picioane
1998: Heath Scotland
1999: Ben Haynes
2000: Paul Chambers
2001: Brad D. Miller
2003: Cameron Gauci, Murray Boyd
2004: Brent Prismall
2006: Cameron Lockwood
2007: Callan Ward, Mitch Banner
2008: Mitch Banner 
2009: Sean Tighe, Johnny Rayner
2010: Adam Kennedy
2011: Will Hoskin-Elliott, Adam Kennedy
2012: Lachie Hunter
Source:1992-2010

Grand Finals

References

External links

SportingPulse Homepage for Western Jets

NAB League clubs
1991 establishments in Australia
Sport in the City of Hobsons Bay
Williamstown, Victoria
Australian rules football clubs established in 1991
Australian rules football clubs in Melbourne